Markus Haris Maulana or Muhammad Haris Maulana (born Markus Horison Ririhina; 14 March 1981) is an Indonesian former professional footballer who played as a goalkeeper. He is now the goalkeeper coach for Indonesia U16 football team. He made 37 appearances for the Indonesia national team.

Club career
Maulana was born in Pangkalan Brandan, North Sumatra.

After five years playing for PSMS Medan, Maulana decided to move to Persik Kediri in 2008 but in the mid-season of 2008–09, he went back to his former club.

In the 2009–10 season of Indonesia Super League, Maulana played for Arema Malang. He also played for Persib Bandung after making his debut for the club on 21 February 2010 with 2–0 against Persisam Putra Samarinda as a substitute on the farewell match of Sinthaweechai Hathairattanakool.

International career
Maulana's debut in the Indonesia national team came in a friendly match against Hongkong on 1 June 2007, which Indonesia won 3–0. He played once in the 2007 AFC Asian Cup, in Indonesia's 1–0 loss against South Korea on 18 July 2007. He participated in PON 2000 in East Java and PON 2004 in Sumatera Selatan.

Post-playing career
In 2018, following his retirement as a player, Maulana became goalkeeping coach at Aceh United.

Personal life
Maulana changed his name in August 2009 after converting to Islam. He was married to famous actress Kiki Amalia on November 2010. However, the marriage did not last long; Maulana filed for divorce in 2012 and they were legally divorced in June 2013.

Honours
PSMS Medan
 Bang Yos Gold Cup: 2004, 2005, 2006

Indonesia
 Asian Cup first round: 2007
 AFF Suzuki Cup: runners-up 2010; semi-final 2008

Individual
 Man of the match in the Bang Yos Gold Cup 2006 final

References

External links

1981 births
Living people
People from Langkat Regency
People of Batak descent
Association football goalkeepers
Indonesian footballers
Indonesia international footballers
2007 AFC Asian Cup players
Indonesian former Christians
Indonesian Muslims
Converts to Islam from Christianity
Persik Kediri players
PSMS Medan players
Persib Bandung players
Persiraja Banda Aceh players
Arema F.C. players
PSM Makassar players
Liga 1 (Indonesia) players
Indonesian Premier League players
Indonesian Premier Division players
Sportspeople from North Sumatra